Kunloja is a political magazine published in North Korea. Launched in 1946 it is published monthly and is an official publication of the Central Committee of the Workers' Party of Korea.

History and profile
Kunloja was first published on 25 October 1946 in Soviet Korea. It is published on a monthly basis. The magazine is an official organ of the Central Committee of the Workers' Party of Korea, and covers articles on political science.

Major contributors of Kunloja have included: Kim Chol and Ryom Kyong-yun. North Korean human rights experts also published articles in the magazine, including Kim Chang-ryul, Ahn Myung-hyuk and Kim Young-guk.

Editors-in-chief
 Tae Song-su (October 1946 – November 1947)
 Pak Chang-ok (November 1947 – March 1948)
 Ki Sok-bok (March 1948 – 1950)

See also
Rodong Sinmun – Central Committee of the Workers' Party of Korea daily
Qiushi – Communist Party of China equivalent

References

External links

1946 establishments in North Korea
Communist magazines
Magazines established in 1946
Magazines published in North Korea
Mass media in Pyongyang
Monthly magazines
Propaganda newspapers and magazines
State media